LCP may refer to:

Science, medicine and technology
Large Combustion Plant, see Large Combustion Plant Directive
Le Chatelier's principle, equilibrium law in chemistry
Left Circular polarization, in radio communications
Legg–Calvé–Perthes syndrome, hip disorder
Licensed Clinical Psychologist, see Clinical psychology
Ligand close packing theory, in chemistry
Light compensation point, in biology
Linear complementarity problem, in mathematical optimisation
Link Control Protocol, in computer networking
Liquid Crystal Polymer, a kind of polymer
Liverpool Care Pathway for the Dying Patient, care guidance for dying hospital patients
Living cationic polymerization, a process in chemistry
Locking Compression Plate, an implant aiding the healing of a bone fracture
Long-chain polyunsaturated fatty acid
Longest Common Prefix array, in computer science

Organisations
Latvijas Centrālās Padomes, Latvian Central Council
Lebanese Communist Party
Liberal and Country Party, the name of the Victorian division of the Liberal Party of Australia from 1949 to 1965
Liberal Country Party, splinter group of the Victorian branch of the Australian Country Party 1938–1943
Library Company of Philadelphia, US library founded by Benjamin Franklin
London College of Communication, formerly the London College of Printing

Other uses
La Chaîne parlementaire, French parliamentary television channel
Lance Corporal, military rank
Least cost planning methodology, in economics modelling 
Little Computer People, 1980s computer simulation game
Livestock Compensation Program, USDA program
Ruger LCP, a subcompact pistol
Temporary residency#Live-in_Caregiver_Program (LCP), Canadian work visa program
Toyota Land Cruiser Prado, a vehicle

See also
Landing Craft Vehicle Personnel, type of military boat